(born September 25, 1977) is the drummer of the Japanese rock band Asian Kung-Fu Generation. Ijichi credits the origin of his drumming ability to playing in marching bands in junior high.

He met fellow band members Masafumi Gotō, Kensuke Kita, and Takahiro Yamada while attending Kanto Gakuin University in 1996. Unlike the others, Ijichi had prior band experience and was a member of another college band when approached by the three. After parting ways with his old band, Ijichi joined Gotō, Kita, and Yamada to form Asian Kung-Fu Generation and the four have been together ever since.

Aside from drumming, Ijichi is a skilled pianist and can be heard playing an excerpt of "Claire de Lune" from Debussy's Suite bergamasque for the intro of "Moonlight." He has a degree in engineering and his favourite bands are Brian Setzer, Link, King Bee and Hi-Standard. In comparison to his bandmates, Ijichi is fairly indifferent towards British alternative rock, instead preferring American and Japanese punk rock. He is the only member of the group who listens to heavy metal. Kiyoshi is a part of a small number of Japanese Christians.

He also plays drums in the band Phono Tones.

References

External links 
 
 Asian Kung-Fu Generation
 Phono Tones

1977 births
21st-century drummers
21st-century Japanese pianists
Asian Kung-Fu Generation members
Japanese rock drummers
Japanese rock pianists
Kanto Gakuin University alumni
Living people
Musicians from Kanagawa Prefecture